Marsupiomonadales is an order of green algae in the class Pedinophyceae.

References

Chlorophyta orders
Pedinophyceae